The AK-100 is a Soviet 100mm naval cannon, with a maximum rate of fire of 60 rounds per minute, firing a 26.8 kg munition in HE anti-air or HE fragmentation varieties.

Specification
Weight: 35.5 tons
Elevation: -10 / +85 degrees
Rate of Elevation: 30 degrees per second
Traverse: 360 degrees
Traverse rate: 35 degrees per second
Recoil: 20 in (51 cm)
Rate of fire: 50 to 60 rounds per minute
Typical ammo storage: 350 rounds for a 4,000 ton class frigate

A190
A190, also known as AK-190 and A-190, is a modernized lightweight version of AK-100 developed by Burevestnik Central Scientific Research Institute that first entered service in 1997. Deliveries started to the RF Navy to replace the AK-176 gun mount in 2012 and more than 30 systems with a firing range of more than 20 km were delivered as of 2020. Specifications:
Weight: 15 tons
Elevation: -15 / +85 degrees
Traverse: ± 170 degrees
Rate of fire: 80 rounds per minute
Ammo storage: 80 rounds per gun internal

See also
AK-176
AK-726

References

Naval anti-aircraft guns
Naval guns of the Soviet Union
Arsenal Plant (Saint Petersburg) products